The 2014–15 Maryland Terrapins women's basketball team represented the University of Maryland, College Park in 2014–15 NCAA Division I women's basketball season. They are led by thirteenth year head coach Brenda Frese and played their home games at the Xfinity Center. They were first year members of the Big Ten Conference after 38 seasons playing in the Atlantic Coast Conference. The 2014-15 Lady Terrapins won the 2014-15 Big Ten regular season Championship and the 2015 Big Ten Conference women's basketball tournament in their first year as a member of the Big Ten. They were the third women's basketball program in the Big Ten to go undefeated in the conference. The 1984-85 Ohio State Buckeyes and the 1998-99 Purdue Boilermakers were the only other women's programs in the Big Ten to accomplish that feat. They received an automatic to the NCAA women's basketball tournament where they advance to the final four where they lost to the national champions Connecticut.

Previous season
The Maryland Terrapins women's basketball finished the 2013-14 season with an overall record of 28–7, with a record of 12–4 in the ACC regular season for a tie for a 2nd-place finish. In the 2014 ACC tournament, the Terrapins lost in the quarterfinals to North Carolina. They were invited to the 2014 NCAA Division I women's basketball tournament, which they defeated Army, Texas, Tennessee and Louisville to make it to the final four where they were defeated by Notre Dame.

Off Season

Departures

2014 Recruiting Class

Roster

Schedule

|-
!colspan=9 style="background:#CE1126; color:#FFFFFF;"| Exhibition

|-
!colspan=9 style="background:#CE1126; color:#FFFFFF;"| Non-conference regular season

|-
!colspan=9 style="background:#CE1126; color:#FFFFFF;"| Big Ten Regular Season

|-
!colspan=9 style="background:#CE1126; color:#FFFFFF;"| Big Ten Conference Women's Tournament|-
!colspan=9 style="background:#CE1126; color:#FFFFFF;"| NCAA Women's Tournament

Rankings

See also
2014–15 Maryland Terrapins men's basketball team

References

Maryland Terrapins women's basketball seasons
Maryland
Maryland
NCAA Division I women's basketball tournament Final Four seasons
Maryland
Maryland